Walter Smith Bird (12 July 1891 – 2 March 1965) was an English professional footballer who played as an inside forward.

References

1891 births
1965 deaths
English footballers
Association football inside forwards
Coalville Swifts F.C. players
Notts County F.C. players
Grimsby Town F.C. players
Bristol Rovers F.C. players
Dundee F.C. players
Heart of Midlothian F.C. players
Kilmarnock F.C. players
Loughborough Corinthians F.C. players
English Football League players
People from Hugglescote
Footballers from Leicestershire